Northbrook Park, Farnham in Surrey is  listed on the English Heritage Register as Grade II. It is a Georgian house built in about 1810 for Admiral Sir John Acworth Ommanney. Later it was the home of John Frederick Schroder,  the founder in England of the present financial company Schroders. Today it is a wedding venue.

References

External link

Farnham